Q'urawiri (Aymara for slinger, someone who catapults something, also spelled Qorawiri, Qurawiri, Hispanicized spelling Corahuiri) is a mountain in the Andes of Peru, about  high. It is located in the Apurímac Region, Abancay Province, Circa District, and in the Grau Province, Chuquibambilla District. Huch'uy Q'urawiri (Quechua huch'uy small, "little Q'urawiri") is northwest of it.

References

Mountains of Peru
Mountains of Apurímac Region